Pipethiaden is a benzothiepin-based drug candidate that was at one time studied as a potential preventive to reduce the frequency of recurrent migraine headaches. It also has some activity as an antihistamine acting mainly at the 5-HT2A and 5HT2C receptors.

References 

Abandoned drugs
5-HT2 antagonists
H1 receptor antagonists
Piperidines